Eddie Dean Watt  (born April 4, 1941) is an American former professional baseball player. He played in Major League Baseball as a right-handed relief pitcher from  through , most prominently as a member of the Baltimore Orioles dynasty that won three consecutive American League pennants from 1969 to 1971 and, won the World Series in 1970. He also played for the Philadelphia Phillies and the Chicago Cubs. In 2000, Watt was inducted into the Baltimore Orioles Hall of Fame.

Baseball career
Watt started just 13 out of the 411 games he appeared in, all during his rookie season. He was 2–5 as a starter and 7–2 with 4 saves as a reliever for the 1966 World Series Champion Orioles. He did not appear in any of the four World Series games against the Los Angeles Dodgers. Jim Palmer, Wally Bunker, and Dave McNally all pitched complete games, and the team needed only one relief appearance, provided in record fashion by Moe Drabowsky.

In 1969 the Orioles won the American League pennant and were upset in the World Series by the New York Mets. Watt contributed to Baltimore's 109–53 regular season record with a career-high 16 saves and a career-low 1.65 earned run average in 71 innings.

Watt was an important part of Baltimore's 1970 Championship season though it was not one of his best seasons statistically. He won 7 games and saved 12 with a 3.25 ERA in 53 appearances. He was the losing pitcher in the Orioles' 6–5 defeat to the Cincinnati Reds in Game 4 of the 1970 World Series. With the Orioles leading 5–3, he entered the contest in relief of Jim Palmer who had allowed a walk to Tony Pérez and a single to Johnny Bench to open the top of the eighth inning. His first pitch to Lee May resulted in a three-run homer to left field that prevented the Orioles from sweeping the Series which it would eventually win the following day. Watt had not pitched in any match during the previous two weeks.

In Game 1 of the 1971 American League Championship Series versus the Oakland Athletics, Watt relieved starter Dave McNally, blanking the A's for the last two innings, earning a save.  The Orioles would go on to sweep the Athletics, eventually facing the Pittsburgh Pirates in that year's Fall Classic, where Watt would make relief appearances in Games 3 and 4. 

He was consistently effective during seven seasons of pitching exclusively in relief for Baltimore. From 1967 to 1973 he averaged 46 appearances, 67 innings, and 10 saves with an ERA of 2.40.

On December 7, 1973 Watt was purchased by the Philadelphia Phillies for an estimated $70,000. In 1974 he appeared in 42 games for the Phils, going 1–1 with 6 saves and a 3.99 ERA. He was released by Philadelphia just before Opening Day in 1975, and he hooked on briefly with the Chicago Cubs, making his last major league appearance on June 14, 1975. He spent most of the season with the Wichita Aeros of the American Association.

Career totals include a record of 38–36 in 411 games pitched, 13 games started, 1 complete game, 240 games finished, 80 saves, and an ERA of 2.91. In 659.2 innings he gave up just 37 home runs, an average of about one per 18 innings, and had a very low WHIP of 1.188. He had a batting average of .190 in 100 at bats with 3 home runs, hit against Johnny Podres, Frank Kreutzer, and Sam McDowell.

References

External links

Eddie Watt at SABR (Baseball Bioproject)
Eddie Watt at Baseball Library
Eddie Watt at Pura Pelota (Venezuelan Professional Baseball League)
Klingaman, Mike. "Catching up with...former Oriole Eddie Watt," The Toy Department (The Baltimore Sun sports blog), Monday, May 2, 2011.

1941 births
Living people
Aberdeen Pheasants players
Appleton Foxes players
Baltimore Orioles players
Baseball players from Iowa
Chicago Cubs players
Elmira Pioneers players
Hawaii Islanders players
Major League Baseball pitchers
Minor league baseball managers
Navegantes del Magallanes players
American expatriate baseball players in Venezuela
Northern Iowa Panthers baseball players
People from Dodge County, Nebraska
People from Lamoni, Iowa
Philadelphia Phillies players
Reno Silver Sox players
Rochester Red Wings players
Tiburones de La Guaira players
Tigres de Aragua players
Wichita Aeros players